Osteocalcin, also known as bone gamma-carboxyglutamic acid-containing protein (BGLAP), is a small (49-amino-acid) noncollagenous protein hormone found in bone and dentin, first identified as a calcium-binding protein.

Because osteocalcin has gla domains, its synthesis is vitamin K dependent. In humans, osteocalcin is encoded by the BGLAP gene. Its receptors include GPRC6A, GPR158, and possibly a third, yet-to-be-identified receptor. There is evidence that GPR37 might be the third osteocalcin receptor.

Function 
Osteocalcin is secreted solely by osteoblasts and thought to play a role in the body's metabolic regulation. In its carboxylated form it binds calcium directly and thus concentrates in bone.

In its uncarboxylated form, osteocalcin acts as a hormone in the body, signalling in the pancreas, fat, muscle, testes, and brain.

 In the pancreas, osteocalcin acts on beta cells, causing beta cells in the pancreas to release more insulin.
 In fat cells, osteocalcin triggers the release of the hormone adiponectin, which increases sensitivity to insulin.
 In muscle, osteocalcin acts on myocytes to promote energy availability and utilization and in this manner favors exercise capacity.
 In the testes, osteocalcin acts on Leydig cells, stimulating testosterone biosynthesis and therefore affects male fertility.
In the brain, osteocalcin plays an important role in development and functioning including spatial learning and memory.

An acute stress response (ASR), colloquially known as the fight-or-flight response, stimulates osteocalcin release from bone within minutes in mice, rats, and humans. Injections of high levels of osteocalcin alone can trigger an ASR in the presence of adrenal insufficiency.

Use as a biochemical marker for bone formation
As osteocalcin is produced by osteoblasts, it is often used as a marker for the bone formation process. It has been observed that higher serum osteocalcin levels are relatively well correlated with increases in bone mineral density during treatment with anabolic bone formation drugs for osteoporosis, such as teriparatide. In many studies, osteocalcin is used as a preliminary biomarker on the effectiveness of a given drug on bone formation. For instance, one study which aimed to study the effectiveness of a glycoprotein called lactoferrin on bone formation used osteocalcin as a measure of osteoblast activity.

References

Further reading

External links 
 
 

Hormones of bone
Peptide hormones